Zamin-e Bandabad-e Barik (also Romanized as Zamīn-e Bandābād-e Bārīk) is a village in Deh Kahan Rural District, Aseminun District, Manujan County, Kerman Province, Iran. At the 2006 census, its population was 275, in 59 families.

References 

Populated places in Kahnuj County